Michelle Baptiste (born 27 August 1977) is a Saint Lucian long jumper. She was the first woman to represent Saint Lucia at the Olympics.

Career

She won the bronze medal at the 1999 Central American and Caribbean Championships. She also competed at the 1996 Olympic Games without reaching the final round.

Her personal best jump is 6.47 metres, achieved in May 1996 in Springfield.

Achievements

References

External links

Picture of Michelle Baptiste

1977 births
Living people
Saint Lucian female sprinters
Saint Lucian long jumpers
Athletes (track and field) at the 1996 Summer Olympics
Olympic athletes of Saint Lucia
Athletes (track and field) at the 1999 Pan American Games
Pan American Games competitors for Saint Lucia
Female long jumpers